Epic Citadel is a tech demo developed by Epic Games to demonstrate the Unreal Engine 3 running on Apple iOS, within Adobe Flash Player Stage3D and using HTML5 WebGL technologies. It was also released for Android on January 29, 2013.

The application allows players to explore a medieval landscape without being able to interact with it otherwise. The application further has a built in benchmark mode and a "guided tour" mode. Nonetheless this demonstration garnered significant attention as it showcases a free SDK called Epic’s Unreal Development Kit (UDK)

The game uses dual zones with touchscreen control that are mapped as virtual joysticks. One controls the camera angle while the other controls the motion of the camera. The tech demo allows players to navigate through a fictional castle realm with various areas such as a circus bazaar, a river and a cathedral. The artwork of this demo was created by Shane Claudie and the program itself was created in eight weeks by a small team of programmers at Epic Games using the UDK.

History
Epic Citadel was a precursor to the video game Infinity Blade for iOS, which was released on December 9, 2010.

On March 7, 2012, Epic released Epic Citadel for Flash, to demonstrate Unreal Engine 3 running within Adobe Flash Player in a web browser environment. It was the first gaming 3D engine to be ported to run within Flash Player, using the CrossBridge cross-compiler (also known as Alchemy).

On January 29, 2013, the app was launched for Google Android (version 2.3+), with exclusive benchmarking features, and was downloadedable from the Google Play store. The iOS version was updated to version 1.1, adding support for the iPhone 5/iPod Touch (fifth generation) as well as optimized graphics for the iPad with Retina Display.

Using additional technologies such as the C/C++ to JavaScript cross-compiler Emscripten, the application was ported to HTML5 supporting run time environments such as the Firefox web browser.

References

External links
Official Site

Epic Games
IOS software
IOS games
Unreal Engine games
Epic Games games